Never Say Die (1951–1975) was an American-bred, British-trained Thoroughbred racehorse. After winning only once from his first nine races, he demonstrated much improved form in the summer of 1954 to win the Derby, becoming the first American-bred colt to win the race in 73 years. Later that year he added a second British Classic, when winning the St. Leger Stakes by a record margin of twelve lengths. He was later retired to a successful stud career.

Background
Never Say Die was a chestnut colt with a white blaze and three white feet, bred and raced by the American philanthropist and art collector Robert Sterling Clark. At the time of his Derby win, the horse stood 15.3  hands high. He was conceived in Ireland but foaled at Jonabell Farm (which was leased at the time from the famed Hamburg Place) in Kentucky. His sire, Nasrullah had been a talented but temperamental racehorse who was beginning to have an impact as a stallion. Never Say Die's dam, Singing Grass won seven unimportant races in England. Clark sent the colt to England as a yearling to be trained by Joseph Lawson, who had already won nine Classics Clark's other British trainer, Harry Peacock had been given first choice of the owner's yearlings but had rejected Never Say Die because of his low opinion of Nasrullah's stock.

Racing career

1953:two-year-old season
In six races as a two-year-old, Never Say Die showed some good form but appeared to be somewhat below the best of his generation. He won the six furlong Rosslyn Stakes at Ascot Racecourse in July and finished third in both the Richmond Stakes and Dewhurst Stakes. In the Free Handicap, a rating of the year's best British juveniles, Never Say Die was allotted a weight of 115 pounds, eighteen pounds below the top-rated The Pie King.

1954:three-year-old season
Never Say Die made good physical progress over the winter, but showed little improvement in his first two starts. He finished second in the Union Jack Stakes at Aintree Racecourse and then finished unplaced in the Free Handicap at Newmarket in April. On his final trial race for The Derby, Never Say Die returned to Newmarket and was moved up in distance for the Newmarket Stakes over ten furlongs. Ridden by Manny Mercer, he took the lead a furlong out but was overtaken in the closing stages and finished third to Elopement and Golden God.

On a dull, chilly day at Epsom, Never Say Die started a 33/1 outsider in a field of twenty-two runners for the Derby. According to some accounts, he would have started at even longer odds if his memorable name and the publicity attracted by his eighteen-year-old jockey Lester Piggott had not made him a popular choice with many members of the public. The colt was always well-placed and was sent into the lead early in the straight by Piggott. He won comfortably by two lengths from Arabian Night and Darius. Clark was ill in New York hospital and unable to attend the race, which saw Never Say Die becoming the first American-bred Derby winner since Iroquois in 1881.  Never Say Die next contested the King Edward VII Stakes at Ascot Racecourse. In an extremely rough and unsatisfactory race he finished fourth behind Rashleigh.  Piggott was immediately suspended by the racecourse stewards for his riding of Never Say Die and was reported to the Jockey Club who extended the riding ban to six months.

The suspended Piggott was replaced by Charlie Smirke for Never Say Die's run in the St Leger at Doncaster in September. The colt started 100/30 favourite in a field of sixteen. He won very easily by twelve lengths, the biggest winning margin officially recorded in the race's history. He was retired to stud shortly after his win at Doncaster.

Assessment
Timeform awarded Never Say Die a rating of 137, the highest for any horse in 1954. A rating of 130 is considered the mark of an above average European Group One winner.

In their book A Century of Champions, John Randall and Tony Morris rated  Never Say Die a “superior” Derby winner and the fifty-third best British racehorse of the 20th Century .

Stud record
On retirement, Clark, gave him to the British National Stud. He was champion sire in 1962, thanks to Larkspur's Derby victory. He also sired The Oaks and 1,000 Guineas winner Never Too Late and other good winners in Die Hard and Sostenuto, stayers who both won the Ebor Handicap.

Never say Die was put down in 1975, by when his stock had won 309 races worth more than £400,000 in Great Britain. He is buried in The National Stud's horse cemetery.

Pedigree

References

 The Complete Encyclopedia of Horse Racing - written by Bill Mooney and George Ennor

1951 racehorse births
1975 racehorse deaths
Racehorses bred in Kentucky
Racehorses trained in the United Kingdom
Thoroughbred family 1-n
Chefs-de-Race
Epsom Derby winners
St Leger winners